William Duncan  Fritz (1914 – 1995) was a Canadian athlete who competed in the 1936 Summer Olympics.

He was born in Ferry Bank, Alberta on August 14, 1914. He and died in London, Ontario on October 14, 1995.

In 1936 he was a member of the Canadian relay team which finished fourth in the 4×400 metre event. In the 400 metre competition he finished fifth.

At the 1934 Empire Games he won the silver medal with the Canadian team in the 4×440 yards relay event. In the 440 yards competition he finished fourth. Four years later he was part of the Canadian relay team which won the gold medal in the 4×440 yards contest at the 1938 Empire Games. At these Games he also won the silver medal in the 440 yards event.

External links
sports-reference.com

1914 births
1995 deaths
Sportspeople from Alberta
Canadian male sprinters
Olympic track and field athletes of Canada
Athletes (track and field) at the 1936 Summer Olympics
Athletes (track and field) at the 1934 British Empire Games
Athletes (track and field) at the 1938 British Empire Games
Commonwealth Games gold medallists for Canada
Commonwealth Games silver medallists for Canada
Commonwealth Games medallists in athletics
20th-century Canadian people
Medallists at the 1934 British Empire Games
Medallists at the 1938 British Empire Games